Federal Way is a city in King County, Washington, United States. One of the most recently incorporated cities in the county, its population was 101,030 at the 2020 census. Federal Way is the tenth-largest city in Washington and the fifth-largest in King County.

History
Originally a logging settlement, the area was first called "Federal Way" in 1929. The name derived from Federal Highway U.S. 99 (now State Route 99 or Pacific Highway South), which ran from Everett and Seattle to Tacoma. The name "Federal Way" was first used in 1929 when five existing schools consolidated operations into School District #210 and planned construction of Federal Way High School, which opened in 1930 and gave its name to the school district. The local chamber of commerce adopted the name in the early 1950s.

Attempts to incorporate the city were voted down in 1971, 1981 and 1985. The voters eventually approved incorporation as a city on February 28, 1990; the official act of incorporation was held at the Sportsworld Lanes bowling complex.

Commerce and attractions
Until 2014, Federal Way was home to Weyerhaeuser, the largest private owner of softwood timberland in the world. Weyerhaeuser had opened much of its land in Federal Way to the public, including two botanical gardens: the Rhododendron Species Foundation and Botanical Garden, and the Pacific Bonsai Museum. In 2014, the company announced it would vacate its Federal Way headquarters. City leaders have suggested promoting the location as a potential community college. Federal Way is also home to the US headquarters of World Vision International.

Other attractions in the city include the Weyerhaeuser King County Aquatic Center, which features an Olympic-size swimming pool which has been used for the 1990 Goodwill Games and 2012 US Olympic Swim & Dive Trials. Celebration Park includes sports fields, a playground, and wooded trails. The city has also developed many lakefront and neighborhood parks, playgrounds, and trails.

The  PowellsWood Garden, known for its outstanding structural plantings and perennial borders, is located off South Dash Point Road. This land, on a portion of the Cold Creek ravine, was purchased by Monte and Diane Powell in 1993 in order to preserve green space in an increasingly urbanized area.

Wild Waves Theme & Water Park, the largest amusement park in the region, opened in 1977 on the south side of the city. It is the Seattle area's only permanent amusement park. Six Flags purchased Wild Waves in December 2000. However, after low sales, Six Flags sold the park in April 2007 to Parc Management LLC of Jacksonville, Florida, for $31.75 million.

Federal Way is locally identified by its 1990s semi-urban development, characterized by landscaped off-street multi-structure apartment complexes and shopping centers. The Commons at Federal Way, the city's only indoor shopping mall, is located on South 320th Street and Pacific Highway South (State Route 99) near the city's main Interstate 5 exit.

Major city and state parks
 Steel Lake Park – located on S 312th Street east of Pacific Hwy S; large lakefront area with picnic areas, playground, and boat launch.
 Celebration Park – on 11th Avenue S just south of S 324th Street; with sports fields and wooded trails, and Independence Day fireworks.
 Dash Point State Park – 53rd Avenue SW & SW Dash Point Road; the only developed waterfront park located within the city, including hiking trails and campground.
 West Hylebos Wetlands Park – at S 348th Street and 4th Avenue S, with hiking trails through wetlands. The park also features two iconic buildings: the nearby Barker Cabin built in 1883, which is the city's oldest known building, and the  Denny Cabin, which was once located west of present-day Seattle Center. The Denny Cabin was built by David Denny in 1889 as a real-estate office and was made from trees cut down on Queen Anne Hill.
 Dumas Bay Centre Park – on SW Dash Point Road; includes a beach, picnic area and walking trail
 Lakota Park – on SW Dash Point Road; includes baseball field, softball field, football field and 440 yard running track
 Saghalie Park – at 19th Avenue SW; includes basketball court, 440-yard track, children's playground, soccer and football field, sand volleyball, tennis courts and baseball courts
 The BPA Trail extends from the entrance to Celebration Park west to approximately 18th Avenue SW, then south to the Pierce County border. The trail is paved and lies under the Bonneville Power Administration electricity transmission line.

Downtown tower projects
In 2007, the city of Federal Way purchased a downtown lot formerly used by a defunct AMC Theatres cinema, and invited proposals from two developers, United Properties and Alpert Capital, to develop a multi-use tower project in the downtown core, adjacent to the recently built transit center. Such a project follows in the steps of similar multi-use developments such as Kent Station in nearby Kent. The city awarded the contract to United Properties' "Symphony" project, comprising four 15–22 story towers, including  of retail and office space, 900 housing units, and a large downtown park which would be relinquished to the city. Transfer of the land to United Properties followed by construction of the first tower was scheduled to start in mid-2008. However, in July 2008, United Properties requested a one-year extension on the terms of the purchase agreement, citing difficulties in the credit and housing markets to acquire the necessary funds. In August 2009, United suggested scrapping the Symphony plan and instead building a performing arts center on the property, a proposal the city rejected.

In September 2009 the South Korean development firm Lander Korus joined onto the project with United. Korus proposed adding Asian elements to the building in order to attract investment and interest from the city's influential Korean population and foreign investment. However, by July 2010, after having granted United and Korus five extensions to close on the project, the city transferred the deal to another Korean developer, Twin Development, which had planned a similar project on another lot. The new developer brought a new design, with two 45-story and one 35-story mixed-use towers. As of 2011 the new developers had yet to close on the property, citing financing difficulties, and had received the seventh extension on the land from the city, which expired in March 2011. The developers were banking on the city's recently granted EB-5 visa qualification to encourage foreign investment in exchange for permanent resident status. As of February 1, 2011, this deal was also dead, as the developer had failed to make a required escrow deposit by the end of January.

In 2011 the city renewed its Request for Quotes for the undeveloped site, and received three proposals. The city ultimately chose a proposal by Arcadd known as the "Crystal Palace", a densely packed glass multi-tower structure where some of the towers bend outward near the top under 20 stories with a larger retail and public space pavilion at the base. The developers, however, were unable to obtain the funds by the initial deadline. After extending the deadline eight months to allow Arcadd to obtain the necessary earnest money, and still seeing no progress, the city decided to move on with a different plan. As of May 2013, plans for a downtown park and plaza complex were underway. In 2014, the lot was repaved, leaving the AMC Theatres building foundation in place, but filling inside its perimeter with sod. The lot was rechristened Town Square Park and opened in early 2014. A plan for a more permanent park design on the site is being considered.

To the north of the downtown park, an elevated lot which was formerly the location of a Toys "R" Us store has been purchased by the city, which is slated to host a planned performing arts and civic center (PACC). The PACC proposal has been controversial, largely over funding and self-sustaining concerns (a similar city project, the Federal Way Community Center, opened in 2007 and ran for most of its operational history in the red), but has the support of most city leaders. It opened as the Performing Arts & Event Center (PAEC) in August 2017.

Also in 2014, ahead of Veterans Day, the city introduced a  flagpole on South 320th Street between Pacific Highway South and Pete von Reichbauer Way South. The pole holds a  flag. While intended to be officially raised on Veterans Day, a smaller flag was raised to half mast on the pole in late October, in memory of State Representative Roger Freeman who died October 29 of that year. The portion of South 320th Street from Pacific Highway to Interstate 5 was dual-named "Veterans Way" in honor of veterans.

Government

Federal Way has mayor–council form of government with a seven-member city council whose members are elected at-large to staggered four-year terms. The city initially had a council–manager government with an appointed city manager, but changed to the mayor–council system after a referendum in November 2009. Former councilmember Jim Ferrell was elected as mayor in 2013 and re-elected in 2017 and 2021.

Growth
As part of the Washington State Growth Management Act of 1990 (GMA), Federal Way has identified areas of unincorporated King County as Potential Annexation Areas (PAAs) to be annexed to the city. Federal Way's current PAAs include the Star Lake and Camelot neighborhoods in Lakeland North and the neighborhoods of Parkland, Lakeland, and Jovita in Lakeland South. All of these neighborhoods are located east of the city proper. While Federal Way had previously considered Auburn's West Hill, Auburn annexed that along with Lea Hill in 2007.

In February 2007, the city announced formal plans to annex the majority of unincorporated land on its east border as one PAA named East Federal Way, comprising the Star Lake, Camelot, Lakeland, and Jovita neighborhoods, and a strip of Peasley Canyon Road connecting the two areas.

On August 21, 2007, residents of the proposed East Federal Way annexation area rejected annexation to Federal Way by a 66% to 34% margin. Opponents of the plan, favoring remaining under direct King County government, asserted fears that increased density and higher taxes would result from annexation despite proponents showing studies that taxes and fees would be unchanged.

In 2011, opponents of annexation petitioned King County to designate this same area as a township, an undefined municipal structure that does not currently exist anywhere else in the state but which the state constitution provides for. Under the plan, township status would prevent the annexation of the area, which would be named Peasley Canyon Township. The King County Council declined to act on the proposal, and the county elections board denied the group a ballot item.

Economy

Largest employers
According to Federal Way's 2019 Comprehensive Annual Financial Report, the largest employers in Federal Way are:

Geography
Federal Way is located in the southwest corner of King County at  (47.312960, −122.339173).

Surrounding cities

Climate
This region experiences warm (but not hot) and dry summers, with no average monthly temperatures above 71.6 °F. According to the Köppen Climate Classification system, Federal Way has a warm-summer Mediterranean climate, abbreviated "Csb" on climate maps.

Demographics

2021 population estimates
As of 2021, the population estimate for Federal Way, WA was 99,037 people, 37,677 housing units. The median household income was $68,672. 29.4% persons age 25 years and over had a bachelor's degree or higher.

2010 census
As of the census of 2010, there were 89,306 people, 33,188 households, and 22,026 families residing in the city. The racial makeup of the city was 57.5% White (51.6% Non-Hispanic White), 9.7% African American, 0.9% Native American, 14.2% Asian, 2.7% Pacific Islander, 8.3% from other races, and 6.6% from two or more races. Hispanic or Latino of any race were 16.2% of the population.

There were 33,188 households, of which 35.9% had children under the age of 18 living with them, 46.7% were married couples living together, 14.0% had a female householder with no husband present, 5.7% had a male householder with no wife present, and 33.6% were non-families. 26.3% of all households were made up of individuals, and 7.3% had someone living alone who was 65 years of age or older. The average household size was 2.67 and the average family size was 3.24.

The median age in the city was 34.9 years. 25.6% of residents were under the age of 18; 10.2% were between the ages of 18 and 24; 27.7% were from 25 to 44; 26.1% were from 45 to 64; and 10.3% were 65 years of age or older. The gender makeup of the city was 49.0% male and 51.0% female. Federal Way has a large Korean American population at more than 5.5%, or 4,978 in the 2013 estimates.

In the city the population was spread out, with 28.2% under the age of 18, 9.9% from 18 to 24, 33.1% from 25 to 44, 21.1% from 45 to 64, and 7.6% who were 65 years of age or older. The median age was 32 years. For every 100 females, there were 96.8 males. For every 100 females age 18 and over, there were 93.6 males.

The median income for a household in the city was $49,278, and the median income for a family was $55,833. Males had a median income of $41,504 versus $30,448 for females. The per capita income for the city was $22,451. About 6.9% of families and 9.3% of the population were below the poverty line, including 12.5% of those under age 18 and 6.5% of those age 65 or over.

Local media
One newspaper is published within Federal Way, the Federal Way Mirror. The city receives additional coverage from most major media sources in both Seattle and Tacoma.

In 2008 the Federal Way Historical Society worked with Arcadia Publishing to publish Images of America: Federal Way, a photographic history of the traditional Federal Way area.

Infrastructure

Transportation
Federal Way is served by I-5 (exits at 348th Street, 320th Street, and 272nd Street) and US Highway 99.

The Federal Way Transit Center, located on 23rd Ave S, was opened in 2006 and provides bus services.

There is an ongoing project (Federal Way Link Extension) to extend Sound Transit light rail from the Angle Lake Station in the City of SeaTac to the Federal Way Transit Center. In January 2017 the final route was approved. Construction began in 2020 and the line is expected to open for service in 2024.

Notable people
 Tony Barnette, Major League Baseball pitcher
 Mario Batali , chef and television personality
 Shaun Bodiford, National Football League wide receiver
 J. R. Celski, three-time Olympic medalist and world champion speed skater
 Hank Conger, Major League Baseball catcher
 Sylvia Day, bestselling novelist of Bared to You
 Michael Dickerson, former National Basketball Association player
 Hassani Dotson, soccer player for Minnesota United FC
 CJ Elleby, basketball player for Portland Trail Blazers
 Bob Ferguson, National Football League player
 Benson Henderson, mixed martial artist and former UFC Lightweight Champion
 Travis Ishikawa, Major League Baseball first baseman
 Reggie Jones, Super Bowl champion, New Orleans Saints, cornerback
 Janson Junk, Major League Baseball pitcher
 Sam Kim, Korean-American singer-songwriter and guitarist
 Floyd Little, former National Football League player
 Sanjaya Malakar, American Idol contestant
 John Moe, author and host of national public radio program Wits
 Lamar Neagle, soccer player for Seattle Sounders FC 
 Ciaran O'Brien, professional soccer player
 Apolo Ohno, speed skater, eight-time Olympic medalist
 Sean Okoli, soccer player for Orange County SC
 Mike Pellicciotti, Washington State Treasurer
 Bill Radke, former host of American Public Media's nationally broadcast shows "Weekend America" and "Marketplace Morning Report"
 Kelyn Rowe, soccer player for Seattle Sounders FC
 Kyle Secor, actor, Homicide: Life on the Street, Commander in Chief, Crossing Jordan
 Dan Spillner, former Major League Baseball pitcher
 James Sun, president of Zoodango, contestant on The Apprentice
 Roy Thomas, Major League Baseball pitcher
 Frank Warnke, retired member of the Washington State Legislature
 DeAndre Yedlin, soccer player for Galatasaray

Sister cities
Federal Way has the following sister cities:
  Donghae, Gangwon Province, South Korea
  Hachinohe, Aomori Prefecture, Japan
  Rivne, Rivne Oblast, Ukraine

References

External links

 Official website
 Federal Way Chamber of Commerce
 Historical Society of Federal Way
 Federal Way History
 Federal Way QuickFacts from the US Census Bureau
 

 
Cities in Washington (state)
Cities in King County, Washington
Cities in the Seattle metropolitan area
Populated places established in 1929
Former census-designated places in Washington (state)
Populated places on Puget Sound